Clavagella is a genus of marine bivalves in the family Clavagellidae.

Taxonomy 
Subgenera:

Clavagella (Bryopa) (Gray 1847)
Clavagella (Clavagella) Blainville 1817
Clavagella (Dacosta) Gray 1858

Species:

†Clavagella elegans Müller, 1859
Clavagella liratum (Tate, 1887)
Clavagella melitensis
Clavagella primigenia Deshayes 1857

Fossil species 
The genus is also represented in the fossil record.

Clavagella elegans is from the Campanian-Maastrichtian (Upper Cretaceous) of Tinrhert in the Sahara province of Algeria. The type specimen (number MNHN.F.R53841) is kept at the Museum National d'Histoire Naturelle in Paris.

References

External links 
 

Clavagellidae
Bivalve genera